Cryonics (from  kryos meaning 'cold') is the low-temperature freezing (usually at ) and storage of human remains, with the speculative hope that resurrection may be possible in the future. Cryonics is regarded with skepticism within the mainstream scientific community. It is generally viewed as a pseudoscience, and its practice has been characterized as quackery.

Cryonics procedures can begin only after the "patients" are clinically and legally dead. Cryonics procedures may begin within minutes of death, and use cryoprotectants to try to prevent ice formation during cryopreservation. It is, however, not possible for a corpse to be reanimated after undergoing vitrification, as this causes damage to the brain including its neural circuits. The first corpse to be frozen was that of James Bedford in 1967. As of 2014, about 250 bodies had been cryopreserved in the United States, and 1,500 people had made arrangements for cryopreservation of their corpses.

Critics argue that economic reality means it is highly improbable that any cryonics corporation could continue in business long enough to take advantage of the claimed long-term benefits offered. Early attempts of cryonic preservations were performed in the 1960s and early 1970s which ended in failure with all but one of the companies going out of business, and their stored corpses thawed and disposed of.

Conceptual basis
Cryonicists argue that as long as brain structure remains intact, there is no fundamental barrier, given our current understanding of physical law, to recovering its information content. Cryonics proponents go further than the mainstream consensus in saying that the brain does not have to be continuously active to survive or retain memory. Cryonics controversially states that a human survives even within an inactive brain that has been badly damaged, provided that original encoding of memory and personality can, in theory, be adequately inferred and reconstituted from what structure remains.

Cryonics uses temperatures below −130 °C, called cryopreservation, in an attempt to preserve enough brain information to permit the future revival of the cryopreserved person. Cryopreservation may be accomplished by freezing, freezing with cryoprotectant to reduce ice damage, or by vitrification to avoid ice damage. Even using the best methods, cryopreservation of whole bodies or brains is very damaging and irreversible with current technology.

Cryonics advocates hold that in the future the use of some kind of presently-nonexistent nanotechnology may be able to help bring the dead back to life and treat the diseases which killed them. Mind uploading has also been proposed.

Cryonics in practice
Cryonics can be expensive. , the cost of preparing and storing corpses using cryonics ranged from US$28,000 to $200,000.

When used at high concentrations, cryoprotectants can stop ice formation completely. Cooling and solidification without crystal formation is called vitrification. The first cryoprotectant solutions able to vitrify at very slow cooling rates while still being compatible with whole organ survival were developed in the late 1990s by cryobiologists Gregory Fahy and Brian Wowk for the purpose of banking transplantable organs. This has allowed animal brains to be vitrified, warmed back up, and examined for ice damage using light and electron microscopy. No ice crystal damage was found; cellular damage was due to dehydration and toxicity of the cryoprotectant solutions.

Costs can include payment for medical personnel to be on call for death, vitrification, transportation in dry ice to a preservation facility, and payment into a trust fund intended to cover indefinite storage in liquid nitrogen and future revival costs. As of 2011, U.S. cryopreservation costs can range from $28,000 to $200,000, and are often financed via life insurance. KrioRus, which stores bodies communally in large dewars, charges $12,000 to $36,000 for the procedure. Some customers opt to have only their brain cryopreserved ("neuropreservation"), rather than their whole body.

As of 2014, about 250 corpses have been cryogenically preserved in the U.S., and around 1,500 people have signed up to have their remains preserved. As of 2016, four facilities exist in the world to retain cryopreserved bodies: three in the U.S. and one in Russia.

Considering the lifecycle of corporations, it is extremely unlikely that any cryonics company could continue to exist for sufficient time to take advantage even of the supposed benefits offered: historically, even the most robust corporations have only a one-in-a-thousand chance of surviving even one hundred years.

Obstacles to success

Preservation damage 
Cryopreservation has long been used by medical laboratories to maintain animal cells, human embryos, and even some organized tissues, for periods as long as three decades. Recovering large animals and organs from a frozen state is however not considered possible at the current level of scientific knowledge  Large vitrified organs tend to develop fractures during cooling, a problem worsened by the large tissue masses and very low temperatures of cryonics. Without cryoprotectants, cell shrinkage and high salt concentrations during freezing usually prevent frozen cells from functioning again after thawing. Ice crystals can also disrupt connections between cells that are necessary for organs to function.

In 2016, Robert L. McIntyre and Gregory Fahy at the cryobiology research company 21st Century Medicine, Inc. won the Small Animal Brain Preservation Prize of the Brain Preservation Foundation by demonstrating to the satisfaction of neuroscientist judges that a particular implementation of fixation and vitrification called aldehyde-stabilized cryopreservation could preserve a rabbit brain in "near perfect" condition at −135 °C, with the cell membranes, synapses, and intracellular structures intact in electron micrographs. Brain Preservation Foundation President, Ken Hayworth, said, "This result directly answers a main skeptical and scientific criticism against cryonics—that it does not provably preserve the delicate synaptic circuitry of the brain." However, the price paid for perfect preservation, as seen by microscopy, was tying up all protein molecules with chemical crosslinks, eliminating biological viability.

Some cryonics organizations use vitrification without a chemical fixation step, sacrificing some structural preservation quality for less damage at the molecular level. Some scientists, like João Pedro Magalhães, have questioned whether using a deadly chemical for fixation eliminates the possibility of biological revival, making chemical fixation unsuitable for cryonics.

Outside of cryonics firms and cryonics-linked interest groups, many scientists show strong skepticism toward cryonics methods. Cryobiologist Dayong Gao states that "we simply don't know if (subjects have) been damaged to the point where they've 'died' during vitrification because the subjects are now inside liquid nitrogen canisters." Biochemist Ken Storey argues (based on experience with organ transplants), that "even if you only wanted to preserve the brain, it has dozens of different areas, which would need to be cryopreserved using different protocols."

Revival
Revival would require repairing damage from lack of oxygen, cryoprotectant toxicity, thermal stress (fracturing) and freezing in tissues that do not successfully vitrify, finally followed by reversing the cause of death. In many cases, extensive tissue regeneration would be necessary. This revival technology remains speculative and does not currently exist.

Legal issues
Historically, a person had little control regarding how their body was treated after death as religion held jurisdiction over the ultimate fate of their body. However, secular courts began to exercise jurisdiction over the body and use discretion in carrying out of the wishes of the deceased person. Most countries legally treat preserved individuals as deceased persons because of laws that forbid vitrifying someone who is medically alive. In France, cryonics is not considered a legal mode of body disposal; only burial, cremation, and formal donation to science are allowed. However, bodies may legally be shipped to other countries for cryonic freezing. As of 2015, the Canadian province of British Columbia prohibits the sale of arrangements for body preservation based on cryonics. In Russia, cryonics falls outside both the medical industry and the funeral services industry, making it easier in Russia than in the U.S. to get hospitals and morgues to release cryonics candidates.

In London in 2016, the English High Court ruled in favor of a mother's right to seek cryopreservation of her terminally ill 14-year-old daughter, as the girl wanted, contrary to the father's wishes. The decision was made on the basis that the case represented a conventional dispute over the disposal of the girl's body, although the judge urged ministers to seek "proper regulation" for the future of cryonic preservation following concerns raised by the hospital about the competence and professionalism of the team that conducted the preservation procedures. In Alcor Life Extension Foundation v. Richardson, the Iowa Court of Appeals ordered for the disinterment of Richardson, who was buried against his wishes, for cryopreservation.

A detailed legal examination by Jochen Taupitz concludes that cryonic storage is legal in Germany for an indefinite period of time.

Ethics
In 2009, writing in Bioethics, David Shaw examines the ethical status of cryonics. The arguments against it include changing the concept of death, the expense of preservation and revival, lack of scientific advancement to permit revival, temptation to use premature euthanasia, and failure due to catastrophe. Arguments in favor of cryonics include the potential benefit to society, the prospect of immortality, and the benefits associated with avoiding death. Shaw explores the expense and the potential payoff, and applies an adapted version of Pascal's Wager to the question.

In 2016, Charles Tandy wrote in favor of cryonics, arguing that honoring someone's last wishes is seen as a benevolent duty in American and many other cultures.

History

Cryopreservation was applied to human cells beginning in 1954 with frozen sperm, which was thawed and used to inseminate three women. The freezing of humans was first scientifically proposed by Michigan professor Robert Ettinger when he wrote The Prospect of Immortality (1962). In April 1966, the first human body was frozen—though it had been embalmed for two months—by being placed in liquid nitrogen and stored at just above freezing. The middle-aged woman from Los Angeles, whose name is unknown, was soon thawed out and buried by relatives.

The first body to be cryopreserved and then frozen with the hope of future revival was that of James Bedford, claimed by Alcor's Mike Darwin to have occurred within around two hours of his death from cardiorespiratory arrest (secondary to metastasized kidney cancer) on January 12, 1967. Bedford's corpse is the only one frozen before 1974 still preserved today. In 1976, Ettinger founded the Cryonics Institute; his corpse was cryopreserved in 2011. Robert Nelson, "a former TV repairman with no scientific background" who led the Cryonics Society of California, was sued in 1981 for allowing nine bodies to thaw and decompose in the 1970s; in his defense, he claimed that the Cryonics Society had run out of money. This led to the lowered reputation of cryonics in the U.S.

In 2018, a Y-Combinator startup called Nectome was recognized for developing a method of preserving brains with chemicals rather than by freezing.  The method is fatal, performed as euthanasia under general anesthesia, but the hope is that future technology would allow the brain to be physically scanned into a computer simulation, neuron by neuron.

Demographics
According to The New York Times, cryonicists are predominantly non-religious white males, outnumbering women by about three to one. According to The Guardian, as of 2008, while most cryonicists used to be young, male, and "geeky", recent demographics have shifted slightly towards whole families.

In 2015, Du Hong, a 61-year-old female writer of children's literature, became the first known Chinese national to have her head cryopreserved.

Reception
Cryonics is generally regarded as a fringe pseudoscience. The Society for Cryobiology rejected members who practiced cryonics, and issued a public statement saying that cryonics is "not science", and that it is a "personal choice" how people want to have their dead bodies disposed of.

Russian company KrioRus is the first non-US vendor of cryonics services. Yevgeny Alexandrov, chair of the Russian Academy of Sciences commission against pseudoscience, said there was "no scientific basis" for cryonics, and that the company's offering was based on "unfounded speculation".

Scientists have expressed skepticism about cryonics in media sources, and the Norwegian philosopher Ole Martin Moen has written that the topic receives a "minuscule" amount of attention from academia.

While some neuroscientists contend that all the subtleties of a human mind are contained in its anatomical structure, few neuroscientists will comment directly upon the topic of cryonics due to its speculative nature. Individuals who intend to be frozen are often "looked at as a bunch of kooks". Cryobiologist Kenneth B. Storey said in 2004 that cryonics is impossible and will never be possible, as cryonics proponents are proposing to "over-turn the laws of physics, chemistry, and molecular science". Neurobiologist Michael Hendricks has said that "Reanimation or simulation is an abjectly false hope that is beyond the promise of technology and is certainly impossible with the frozen, dead tissue offered by the 'cryonics' industry".

Anthropologist Simon Dein write that cryonics is a typical pseudoscience because of its lack of falsifiability and testability. In Dein's view cryonics is not science, but religion: it places faith in non-existent technology and promises to overcome death itself.

William T. Jarvis has written that "Cryonics might be a suitable subject for scientific research, but marketing an unproven method to the public is quackery".

According to cryonicist Aschwin de Wolf and others, cryonics can often produce intense hostility from spouses who are not cryonicists. James Hughes, the executive director of the pro-life-extension Institute for Ethics and Emerging Technologies, chooses not to personally sign up for cryonics, calling it a worthy experiment but stating laconically that "I value my relationship with my wife."

Cryobiologist Dayong Gao states that "People can always have hope that things will change in the future, but there is no scientific foundation supporting cryonics at this time." While it is universally agreed that "personal identity" is uninterrupted when brain activity temporarily ceases during incidents of accidental drowning (where people have been restored to normal functioning after being completely submerged in cold water for up to 66 minutes), one argument against cryonics is that a centuries-long absence from life might interrupt the conception of personal identity, such that the revived person would "not be themself".

Maastricht University bioethicist David Shaw raises the argument that there would be no point in being revived in the far future if one's friends and families are dead, leaving them all alone; he notes, however, that family and friends can also be frozen, that there is "nothing to prevent the thawed-out freezee from making new friends", and that a lonely existence may be preferable to no existence at all for the revived.

In fiction

Suspended animation is a popular subject in science fiction and fantasy settings. It is often the means by which a character is transported into the future.

A survey in Germany found that about half of the respondents were familiar with cryonics, and about half of those familiar with cryonics had learned of the subject from films or television.

In popular culture

The town of Nederland, Colorado, hosts an annual Frozen Dead Guy Days festival to commemorate a substandard attempt at cryopreservation.

Notable people

Corpses subjected to the cryonics process include those of baseball players Ted Williams and son John Henry Williams (in 2002 and 2004, respectively), engineer and doctor L. Stephen Coles (in 2014), economist and entrepreneur Phil Salin, and software engineer Hal Finney (in 2014).

People known to have arranged for cryonics upon death include PayPal founders Luke Nosek and Peter Thiel, Oxford transhumanists Nick Bostrom and Anders Sandberg, and transhumanist philosopher David Pearce. Larry King previously arranged for cryonics, but according to Inside Edition, later changed his mind.

Disgraced financier Jeffrey Epstein wanted to have his head and penis frozen after death so that he could "seed the human race with his DNA."

The corpses of some are mistakenly believed to have undergone cryonics – for instance, the urban legend suggesting Walt Disney's corpse was cryopreserved is false; it was cremated and interred at Forest Lawn Memorial Park Cemetery. Robert A. Heinlein, who wrote enthusiastically of the concept in The Door into Summer (serialized in 1956), was cremated and had his ashes distributed over the Pacific Ocean. Timothy Leary was a long-time cryonics advocate and signed up with a major cryonics provider, but he changed his mind shortly before his death and was not cryopreserved.

See also

 Brain in a vat
 Cryptobiosis
 Extropianism
 Hibernation
 Life extension
 Supercooling

References

Footnotes

Citations

Further reading

External links

 

 
Cooling technology
Death customs
Fictional technology
Health fraud
Life extension
Pseudoscience
Scientific speculation